In computability theory, a Friedberg numbering is a numbering (enumeration) of the set of all uniformly recursively enumerable sets that has no repetitions: each recursively enumerable set appears exactly once in the enumeration (Vereščagin and Shen 2003:30).

The existence of such numberings was established by Richard M. Friedberg in 1958 (Cutland 1980:78).

References 
 Nigel Cutland (1980), Computability: An Introduction to Recursive Function Theory, Cambridge University Press. .
 Richard M. Friedberg (1958), Three Theorems on Recursive Enumeration. I. Decomposition. II. Maximal Set. III. Enumeration Without Duplication, Journal of Symbolic Logic 23:3, pp. 309–316. 
 Nikolaj K. Vereščagin and A. Shen (2003), Computable Functions, American Mathematical Soc.

External links
Institute of Mathematics

Computability theory